Mat Kilau: Kebangkitan Pahlawan is a 2022 Malaysian biographical epic film that is inspired by historical events directed by Syamsul Yusof, starring Adi Putra as Mat Kilau bin Imam Rasu, a Malay warrior who fought the British colonialists during the Pahang Uprising in Pahang, British Malaya before independence. The film features Beto Kusyairy, Fattah Amin, Yayan Ruhian, Geoff Andre Feyaerts and Johan As'ari in supporting roles.

The film is set in 1892 when Pahang was under British colonial rule. The film was produced by Rahman Dali, Shahruddin Dali, and Yusof Haslam. Filming began in 2018 and reportedly ended in 2021. The film was co-produced by Studio Kembara Sdn Bhd, and Skop Productions Sdn Bhd.

The official poster of Mat Kilau: Kebangkitan Pahlawan was unveiled on 13 May 2022, while its official trailer was released on 16 June 2022. The film preview ceremony was held at Golden Screen Cinemas (GSC) on the same date. The film was officially released on 23 June 2022.

The film was a commercial success and an audience hit. Produced on a budget of RM8 million, the film grossed RM97 million after 40 days, making it the highest grossing Malaysian film of all time. The film received moderate reviews, but attracted controversy over its depictions of non-Malay characters and promoting Malay nationalism.

Summary 
The story is set in 1892, during the British colonial rule in the lands of Pahang, three years prior to the formation of the Federated Malay States.

The British had exploited the wealth of Pahang's produce belonging to the Malays by imposing taxes on traders and reaping the produce of the people as well as interfering in their customary and religious affairs.

The action was taken by the British without the consent of the Malays in Pahang and has caused them to act against the British.

In the spirit of defending Pahang, his homeland; and Malaya and freeing it from further occupation, Mat Kilau, a Malay warrior, along with his father, Tok Gajah, and his friends, fought hard against the British administration.

Conflict and pressure were faced by the British following the clever plan of resistance by Mat Kilau and Tok Gajah, which turned into a fierce battle. In the story; none of the English is hurt except the forced labours brought from India and China being murdered.

Cast 
 Adi Putra as Mat Kilau
 Beto Kusyairy as Wahid
 Fattah Amin as Awang
 Johan As'ari as Yassin
 Rahim Razali as Imam Bottoqh
 Jalaluddin Hassan as Haji Muhammad
 Namron as Haji Sulong
 Farah Ahmad as Yang Chik
 Wan Hanafi Su as Imam Rasu @ Tok Gajah
 Yayan Ruhian as Toga
 Ali Karimie as Brahim
 Zarina Zainoordin as Rokiah
 Shaharuddin Thamby as Dato' Bahaman
 Khir Rahman as Usup
 Ellie Suriati as Salmah
 Siraj Alsagoff as Shidu
 A. Galak as Pak Deris
 Farid Amirul as Goh Hoi
 Mubarak Majid as Father Yassin
 Z. Zamri as Hitam 
 Geoff Andre Feyaerts as Captain Syers
 Harith Haziq as Omar
 Wan Suhaimi as Kelubi
 Megat Terawis as Mat Hassan
 Awie Bakri as Haji Ali
 Mark Geoffrry as J.P. Rodger
 David Abraham as Sir Hugh Clifford
 Dennis Arthur as Professor Cameron

Production 
Mat Kilau: Kebangkitan Pahlawan became the first film directed by Syamsul Yusof in which he did not act. In August 2017, he announced his intention to direct an epic film about the history of national heroes. He had previously taken up the challenge of working on the script after several production companies and directors allegedly failed to complete the filming of the historical film as well as the struggle over Mat Kilau.

On the night of the KL Special Force film gala in Petaling Jaya on 8 March 2018, Syamsul announced the directing of a historical biographical film revolving around a Malay warrior who opposed the British administration in Pahang, Mat Kilau.

The film officially underwent filming on 1 April 2018 but had to be stopped for a while due to certain unavoidable problems. Singaporean actor Adi Putra plays the role of Mat Kilau. According to Syamsul, Adi was chosen for the main character because he was able to animate the character and confident that he, as an experienced actor, would carry the character well.

In August 2018, filming of the film was stopped due to internal problems before resuming in October. In June 2020, it was reported that the filming of the film was almost completed, and in February 2021, the film was reportedly completed but its screening had to be postponed due to COVID-19 pandemic.

On 15 May 2022, the actual cost of completing the film was revealed to have cost RM8 million. The film underwent 100 days of filming, with some of it shot in Perak and several other locations, including Pahang, Melaka, and Selangor.

Release 
The release poster for Mat Kilau: Kebangkitan Pahlawan was released on 13 May 2022. The film held its premiere at Golden Screen Cinemas (GSC) on 16 June 2022. Its official trailer was also released on the same day. It began streaming internationally on Netflix on September 16, 2022 (Malaysia Day).

Reception

Box office 
As of July 7, 2022, Mat Kilau: Kebangkitan Pahlawan became the highest-grossing local film of all time in Malaysia, breaking the record set by Munafik 2 in 2018.

Controversy 
The film attracted controversy for its depiction of Malays as heroes, and characters of other races including Chinese and Indians as villains. Sikh groups criticised the film and accused the film of depicting non-Muslims as villains, and suggested that the film could generate religious or racial tensions. In Free Malaysia Today, Kua Kia Soong criticised the film, describing it as exemplifying Malay nationalism and depicting numerous ethnic stereotypes.

Sequel 
In July 2022, it was announced the script for a sequel had already been written, and a storyline was ready for a proposed spin-off film.

References

External links 
 
 
 
 
 
 Mat Kilau: Kebangkitan Pahlawan on YouTube

2022 films
2022 biographical drama films
Malaysian historical drama films
Drama films based on actual events
Malay-language films
Films set in the 1890s
2022 war drama films
War films based on actual events
Film controversies in Malaysia
2022 controversies
Race-related controversies in film
Films impacted by the COVID-19 pandemic